Podophacidium is a genus of fungi in the family Dermateaceae that contains two species found in Europe and North America. The type species, originally called Podophacidium terrestre Niessl, is currently known as Podophacidium xanthomelum.

See also
List of Dermateaceae genera

References

Dermateaceae genera
Dermateaceae